The Scout and Guide movement in Sierra Leone is served by:
 The Sierra Leone Girl Guides Association, member of the World Association of Girl Guides and Girl Scouts
 Sierra Leone Scouts Association, member of the World Organization of the Scout Movement